The Hunt Effect refers to two unrelated effects:
 The Weekend effect of healthcare, where the mortality rate increases for patients admitted to hospital on a weekend (named after the former British health secretary Jeremy Hunt)
 The Hunt effect of color science, where colorfulness of a color increases with increasing luminance.